Natalya Anatolyevna Butuzova (born 17 February 1954) is a retired archer from Uzbekistan. She competed for the Soviet Union at the 1980 and 1988 Olympics and won an individual silver medal in 1980. She won the individual and team world and European titles in 1980–1982.

Domestically Butuzova won five Soviet individual titles in 1979–1983. After retiring from competitions she worked as an archery coach in Uzbekistan and Germany.

References 

1954 births
Living people
Soviet female archers
Archers at the 1980 Summer Olympics
Archers at the 1988 Summer Olympics
Olympic silver medalists for the Soviet Union
Olympic medalists in archery
Olympic archers of the Soviet Union
Uzbekistani female archers
World Archery Championships medalists
Medalists at the 1980 Summer Olympics